Bartolomeo d'Alviano (c. 1455 – October 1515) was an Italian condottiero and captain who distinguished himself in the defence of the Venetian Republic against the Holy Roman Emperor Maximilian.

Biography
Bartolomeo d'Alviano was born in 1455 to a noble family in Umbria at Todi to Francesco d'Alviano and Isabella degli Atti. He fought very early in his life in Central Italy, serving in the Papal States and, in 1496, the Orsini family against Pope Alexander VI and the Colonna. In May 1497, Bartolomeo massacred Ghibellines in Todi while reinstalling the Guelfs. The next year he entered the service of Venice until 1503 when he joined the Orsini.

Bartolomeo was then hired by Ferdinand II of Spain. He distinguished himself in the victory at the Battle of Garigliano over the French army, which started the Spanish domination over southern Italy. In 1506, he returned to the Republic of Venice; he would remain in its service until his death. The following year Bartolomeo defeated the Imperial Army of Maximilian I, Holy Roman Emperor, in Cadore (March 2, 1508), at Mauria and Pontebba, conquering Gorizia and Trieste. Pordenone also fell in the same year, and the Serenissima assigned the city's signory to d'Alviano himself, which was ruled by the d'Alviano family until 1539.

In 1509 (the year he began the construction of new city walls at Padua), Bartolomeo was defeated at the Battle of Agnadello while commanding the advance guard, being wounded as a result. After Nicolo Orsini, his co-commander of the Venetian army, refused to come to his aid, he was captured by the French. He remained a prisoner until 1513, when an alliance between France and Venice was formed against the Duchy of Milan. Bartolomeo was chosen as the commander-in-chief of the Venetian Army after being released, and fought under the French commander Louis de la Trémoille. He was defeated at the Battle of La Motta by the Spanish viceroy of Naples Ramón de Cardona and marquis of Pescara Fernando d'Ávalos.

Later, Bartolomeo again conquered and sacked Pordenone, which had fallen again to the House of Habsburg. In 1513-14, during the War of the Holy League, he captured Friuli for Venice. He subsequently played a major role in the French victory in the Battle of Marignano (September 1515), in which he attacked the Swiss mercenaries with a corps of only 300 knights. Later also he managed to conquer Bergamo, but died in October of the same year during the siege of Brescia.

Bartolomeo was buried in the church of Santo Stefano in Venice.

Personal life
In 1497, he married Bartolomea Orsini. Some time later, he married Pantasilea Baglioni.

In fiction
A fictional version of Bartolomeo d'Alviano appears in the video games Assassin's Creed II, Assassin's Creed: Project Legacy and Assassin's Creed: Brotherhood as a member of the Order of Assassins. His second wife, Pantasilea Baglioni, also appears as a member in Brotherhood.

References

Bibliography

1455 births
1515 deaths
People from Todi
15th-century condottieri
Military leaders of the Italian Wars
Republic of Venice generals
16th-century condottieri